St. Thomas is a city in Pembina County, North Dakota, United States. The population was 323 at the 2020 census. The city, located in the Red River Valley region.

History
St. Thomas was laid out in 1881. The city was named after St. Thomas, Ontario.

A U.S. post office has been in operation at St. Thomas since 1881 and is open weekdays.

The St. Thomas Public School was established in 1882. St. Thomas Elementary School and St. Thomas High School offered classes for pre-kindergarten through 12th grade through the 2020-21 school year.  The three-person class of 2021 was the last class to graduate from St. Thomas Public School.  Pre-K-12th grade students from St. Thomas now attend school in Grafton, ND (in the newly consolidated Grafton School District #18).

Geography
St. Thomas is located at  (48.619637, -97.446704).

Demographics

2020 census
As of the census of 2020, there were 323 people lived in St. Thomas. Three-quarters of those residents were born in or near the town itself.  It is a racially and ethnically diverse town, where 16% of residents are Latino, 8% are Indigenous, and most other residents are white.  According to the census, every man who lives in the town owns his home, and 75% of women do too.

2010 census
As of the census of 2010, there were 331 people, 150 households, and 107 families residing in the city. The racial makeup of the city was 94.6% White, 0.6% Native American, 4.5% from other races, and 0.3% from two or more races. Hispanic or Latino of any race were 19.6% of the population.

There were 150 households, of which 27.3% had children under the age of 18 living with them, 53.3% were married couples living together, 9.3% had a female householder with no husband present, 8.7% had a male householder with no wife present, and 28.7% were non-families. 27.3% of all households were made up of individuals, and 11.3% had someone living alone who was 65 years of age or older. The average household size was 2.21 and the average family size was 2.63.

The median age in the city was 46.1 years. 19.6% of residents were under the age of 18; 5.7% were between the ages of 18 and 24; 21.7% were from 25 to 44; 35.2% were from 45 to 64; and 17.8% were 65 years of age or older. The gender makeup of the city was 52.6% male and 47.4% female.

Notable people

 Edward K. Thompson, editor of LIFE magazine and SMITHSONIAN magazine
 Thomas Whelan, United States Ambassador to Nicaragua, 1951 to 1961

References

External links

 Pioneer Women's Histories : St. Thomas and Glasston from the Digital Horizons website
 A century of St. Thomas times (1980) from the Digital Horizons website

Saint Thomas, North Dakota
Saint Thomas
Populated places established in 1881
1881 establishments in Dakota Territory